The 2018 Asian Men's Junior Handball Championship will be the 16th edition of the championship scheduled to be held from 16 to 26 July 2018 at Salalah, Oman under the aegis of Asian Handball Federation. It will be the first time in history that championship will be organised in Oman by the Oman Handball Association. It also acts as the qualification tournament for the 2019 Men's Junior World Handball Championship.  Top three teams from the championship will directly qualify for the Junior World Championship to be held in Spain.

Draw
The draw was held on Friday, 13 April 2018 at 17:30 (UTC+04:00) in the City Seasons Hotel, Muscat, Oman.

Seeding
Teams were seeded according to the AHF COC regulations and rankings of the previous edition of the championship. Teams who had not participate in the previous edition were in Pot 4.

Palestine and Uzbekistan were drawn in Group B and Group C respectively. They withdrew from the tournament after the draw due to unavoidable internal circumstances.

Preliminary round
All times are local (UTC+4).

Group A

Group B

Group C

Group D

9–14th placement matches

Group III

Main round

Group I

Group II

Knockout stage

Bracket

Seventh place game

Fifth place game

Semifinals

Third place game

Final

Final standings

All-Star Team

References

External links

Handball
Asia
Asian Handball Championships
2018 in Omani sport
Asian Men's Junior Handball Championship